KTFO may refer to:

 KTFO-CD, a low-power television station (channel 36, virtual 31) licensed to Austin, Texas, United States
 KMYT-TV, a television station (channel 41) licensed to Tulsa, Oklahoma, United States formerly known as KTFO-TV.